The International Association of Exorcists is a Roman Catholic organization which was founded in 1990 by six priests including the world-famous exorcists of Rome, Father Gabriele Amorth and Father Jeremy Davies. Its statutes were approved by the Roman Catholic Church on June 13, 2014.

History
Although the membership is restricted and exclusive, by 2000 there were over two hundred members, who meet bi-annually in Rome. The association sends out a quarterly newsletter where members can tell of particularly interesting or difficult cases. An exorcist priest must have the permission of his bishop to join the group. 
 
Within the Roman Catholic Church a priest may only perform an exorcism with the express consent of his bishop or local ordinary, and only, to the extent necessary, after an examination of the patient by doctors and psychiatrists in order to determine that the affliction has no natural origin. A priest is required by canon law to be devout, knowledgeable, prudent, and respected for his integrity.

Father Amorth began the organization in the hopes of increasing the number of official exorcists worldwide and to alert more dioceses about the problem, 
 which he believed had been ignored or suppressed by some priests and bishops. During his lifetime, Father Amorth was the honorary president of AIE. His successor as president was Father Giancarlo Gramolazzo, who died in November 2010 and was succeeded in turn by Capuchin Father Cipriano de Meo (born January 5, 1924), and then by Fr. Francesco Bamonte, the current president.

References

External links
 Mexicans confront Satanism with National Meeting of Exorcists
 "An Evening with an Exorcist," a talk given by Fr. Thomas J. Euteneuer
 Fr. Gabriele Amorth: The Power of Satan (part 1) . In: Ignatius Insight  (August 2004) (from: An Exorcist Tells His Story, pp. 25–36; Ignatius Press, 1999 in English, ; original language: Italian)

Catholic organizations
Exorcism in the Catholic Church